Juan Diego Covarrubias (born  Juan Diego Covarrubias Aceves on March 24, 1987, in Guadalajara, Jalisco, México) is a Mexican actor.

Early life and career
Born in Guadalajara, Covarrubias studied at the prestigious boys school, Instituto Cumbres San Javier. He studied at the CEA of Televisa and later landed a role in the teen telenovela Atrévete a soñar, playing Johnnie. Later he joined the cast of the play Bella & Bestia. In 2010 Covarrubias appeared in the telenovela Teresa, playing a young man named Julio. One year later he played Alfredo Irabién Arteaga in the telenovela Una familia con suerte, produced by Juan Osorio.

Covarrubias also participated in the telenovela  Amor Bravio produced by Carlos Moreno Laguillo, where he worked with Cristian de la Fuente, Silvia Navarro, and Leticia Calderon. In 2013 he starred in the telenovela De que te quiero, te quiero with Livia Brito, produced by Lucero Suárez.

Filmography

References

External links
.
Web Site oficial

1985 births
Living people
Mexican male television actors
Mexican male telenovela actors
Mexican male film actors
Male actors from Guadalajara, Jalisco